Liu Xin is the name of:

Liu Xin (scholar) ( 50 BCE – 23 CE), astronomer, historian, librarian, mathematician, politician and Confucian scholar of the Han dynasty 
Emperor Ai of Han (27–1 BC), personal name Liu Xin, emperor of the Han dynasty
Liu Xin (food scientist) (born 1957), Chinese biologist and food scientist
Liu Xin (news anchor) (born 1975), Chinese news anchor for the state-run CCTV
Liu Xin (cyclist) (born 1986), Chinese road cyclist
Liu Xin (badminton) (born 1990), Chinese badminton player
Liu Xin (People's Liberation Army), People's Liberation Army member of the 11th National People's Congress
Liu Yuxin (singer), Chinese singer, dancer and producer
Liu Xin (gymnast), Chinese rhythmic gymnast

See also 
Liu Hsin (crater), a crater on Mars, named after the Han dynasty scholar
Liuxin (柳新), a town in Xuzhou, Jiangsu, China
Liu Xing (born 1984), Chinese Go player